Armando Cungu (born 23 April 1973) is an Albanian football coach and former player. He was the sporting director of his former club Vllaznia between 2010 and 2012.

Managerial career

Laçi
Cungu started his second season in charge of Laçi in July, where the team was going to face Inter Baku for the 2015–16 UEFA Europa League first qualifying round. In the first leg at home, despite making a good overall appearance in the match, Laçi didn't earn more than a 1–1 draw, leaving everything open for the returning leg. In the returning leg, Cungu's side was not able to score as the final result was 0–0, meaning that Laçi are out due to away goal rule. On 12 August, in team's first match in domestic season, Cungu won his second silverware with the club, the Albanian Supercup, where Laçi beat Skënderbeu Korçë on penalty shootouts after a 2–2 draw in regular time.

On 31 December 2015, Cungu resigned as Laçi coach following the poor results lately.

Vllaznia Shkodër
On 8 January 2016, Cungu was appointed the new coach of Vllaznia Shkodër, replacing Armir Grimaj for the second part of 2015–16 season. He was presented to the media the following day, where he signed is 18-month contract.

Managerial statistics

Honours

Manager
Laçi

Albanian Cup (1): 2014–15
Albanian Supercup (1): 2015

Player
Vllaznia
Albanian League (1): 1997–98

References

External links

1973 births
Living people
Footballers from Shkodër
Albanian footballers
Association football midfielders
KF Vllaznia Shkodër players
Ethnikos Piraeus F.C. players
Luftëtari Gjirokastër players
KF Teuta Durrës players
KF Flamurtari players
Albanian expatriate footballers
Expatriate footballers in Greece
Albanian expatriate sportspeople in Greece
Expatriate footballers in Kosovo
Albanian expatriate sportspeople in Kosovo
Albanian football managers
FK Kukësi managers
KF Laçi managers
KF Vllaznia Shkodër managers
Kategoria Superiore players
Kategoria Superiore managers